In the United States, the 13th Amendment to the United States Constitution prohibits slavery and involuntary servitude except as a punishment for a crime of which one has been convicted. In the latter 2010s, a movement has emerged to repeal the exception clause from both the federal and state constitutions.

List of amendments

Federal

 Neither slavery nor involuntary servitude, except as a punishment for crime whereof the party shall have been duly convicted, shall exist within the United States, or any place subject to their jurisdiction. Amendment XIII, Section 1.

State

With exceptions 
 Arkansas: There shall be no slavery in this State, nor involuntary servitude, except as a punishment for crime. No standing army shall be kept in time of peace; the military shall, at all times, be in strict subordination to the civil power; and no soldier shall be quartered in any house, or on any premises, without the consent of the owner, in time of peace; nor in time of war, except in a manner prescribed by law. Arkansas Constitution, Article 2, Section 25.
 California: Slavery is prohibited. Involuntary servitude is prohibited, except to punish crime. Article I, Section 6.
 Georgia: There shall be no involuntary servitude within the State of Georgia except as a punishment for crime after legal conviction thereof or for contempt of court. Article I, Section 1 Paragraph XXII.
 Indiana: There shall be neither slavery, nor involuntary servitude, within the State, otherwise than for the punishment of crimes, whereof the party shall have been duly convicted. Article 1, Section 37
 Iowa: There shall be no slavery in this State; nor shall there be involuntary servitude, unless for the punishment of crime. Article I, Section 23
 Kansas: There shall be no slavery in this state; and no involuntary servitude, except for the punishment of crime, whereof the party shall have been duly convicted.
 Kentucky: Slavery and involuntary servitude in this state are forbidden, except as a punishment of crimes, whereof the party shall have been duly convicted. Article I, Section 25
 Louisiana: No person shall be denied the equal protection of the laws. No law shall discriminate against a person because of race or religious ideas, beliefs, or affiliations. No law shall arbitrarily, capriciously, or unreasonably discriminate against a person because of birth, age, sex, culture, physical condition, or political ideas or affiliations. Slavery and involuntary servitude are prohibited, except in the latter case as punishment for crime. Article I, Section 3.
 Michigan: Neither slavery nor involuntary servitude, unless for the punishment of crimes, shall ever be tolerated in this State. Article I, Section 9.
 Minnesota:  No member of this state shall be disfranchised or deprived of any of the rights or privileges secured to any citizen thereof, unless by the law of the land or the judgement of his peers. There shall be neither slavery nor involuntary servitude in the state, otherwise than as punishment for a crime of which the party has been convicted. Article I, Section 2
 Mississippi: There shall be neither slavery nor involuntary servitude in this State, otherwise than in the punishment of crime, whereof the party shall have been duly convicted. Article 3, Section 15
 Nevada: Neither slavery nor involuntary servitude, unless for the punishment of crimes, shall ever be tolerated in this State. Article 1, Section 17.
 North Carolina - Article 1 Section 17: Slavery is forever prohibited. Involuntary servitude, except as a punishment for crime whereof the parties have been adjudged guilty, is forever prohibited.
 North Dakota: Neither slavery nor involuntary servitude, unless for the punishment of crimes, shall ever be tolerated in this State. Article 1, Section 17
 Ohio: There shall be no slavery in this state; nor involuntary servitude, unless for the punishment of crime. Article I, Section 6.
 Wisconsin: There shall be neither slavery, nor involuntary servitude in this state, otherwise than for the punishment of crime, of which the party shall have been duly convicted. Article I

Without exceptions 

 Alabama: That no form of slavery shall exist in this state; and there shall not be any involuntary servitude, otherwise than for the punishment of crime, of which the party shall have been duly convicted. Alabama Constitution, Section 32 (Amended 2022 by 76% of voters)
 Colorado: There shall never be in this state either slavery or involuntary servitude, except as a punishment for crime, whereof the party shall have been duly convicted. Colorado Constitution Article 2, Section 26 (Amended 2018 by 66% of voters)
 Nebraska: There shall be neither slavery nor involuntary servitude in this state, otherwise than for punishment of crime, whereof the party shall have been duly convicted. Article I, Section 2 (a 2020 amendment to remove the exception was approved by 68% of voters)
 Oregon: Article 1, Section 34 (Amended 2022 by 55% of voters): 
 (1) There shall be neither slavery nor involuntary servitude in the State, otherwise than for the punishment of crime, of which the party shall have been duly convicted this state.  
 (2) Upon conviction of a crime, an Oregon court or a probation or parole agency may order the convicted person to engage in education, counseling, treatment, community service or other alternatives to incarceration, as part of sentencing for the crime, in accordance with programs that have been in place historically or that may be developed in the future, to provide accountability, reformation, protection of society or rehabilitation.
 Tennessee: That Slavery and involuntary servitude, except as a punishment for crime, whereof the party shall have been duly convicted, are forever prohibited. Nothing in this section shall prohibit an inmate from working when the inmate has been duly convicted of a crime. Article 1, Section 33 (Amended 2022 by 79% of voters)
 The General Assembly shall make no law recognizing the right of property in man. Article 1, Section 34
 Utah: Article I, Section 21 (a 2020 amendment to remove the exception was approved by 81% of voters)
 (1) Neither slavery nor involuntary servitude, except as a punishment for crime, whereof the party shall have been duly convicted shall exist within this State. 
 (2) Subsection (1) does not apply to the otherwise lawful administration of the criminal justice system.
 Vermont: That all men are born equally free and independent, and have certain natural, inherent, and unalienable rights, amongst which are the enjoying and defending life and liberty, acquiring, possessing and protecting property, and pursuing and obtaining happiness and safety; therefore no person born in this country, or brought from over sea, ought to be holden by law, to serve any person as a servant, slave or apprentice, after he arrives to the age of twenty-one years, unless he is bound by his own consent, after he arrives to such age, or bound by law for the payment of debts, damages, fines, costs, or the like slavery and indentured servitude in any form are prohibited. Chapter I, Article 1st (Amended 2022 by 88% of voters)
 Rhode Island: Slavery shall not be permitted in this State. Article I, Section 4

State constitutions with no mentions of slavery or involuntary servitude
 Alaska
 Arizona
 Connecticut
 Delaware
 Florida
 Hawaii
 Idaho
 Illinois
 Maine
 Maryland
 Massachusetts
 Missouri
 Montana
 New Hampshire
 New Jersey
 New Mexico
 New York
 Oklahoma
 Pennsylvania
 South Carolina
 South Dakota
 Texas
 Virginia
 Washington
 West Virginia
 Wyoming

Reform and repeal
With Amendment A in 2018, Colorado became the first state to repeal the exception clause from their state's constitution. Bills to repeal similar clauses have passed in Utah and Nebraska after voters approved them in a referendum in 2020.

Following voters approving a 2020 ballot measure allowing Alabama Legislature to recompile the state constitution, the Legislature finalized a repeal of similar penal exception language from the state constitution as part of a bid to remove racist language from the state constitution, which will go to referendum in November 2022. The legislatures of Vermont and Oregon sent similar amendments to voters for a vote in 2022. Tennessee's legislature approved similar language for a 2022 ballot after two consecutive sessions, but, like Utah's 2020 revision, will include a subsection clarifying that the prohibition will not "prohibit an inmate from working when the inmate has been duly convicted of a crime".

In 2021, Nikema Williams and Jeff Merkley introduced legislation (H.J.Res.53/S.J.Res.21) in the 117th Congress to repeal the exception clause from the U.S. Constitution.

A resolution to bring a repeal to the California state constitution in 2022 was passed unanimously in the California State Assembly. The resolution failed to receive enough votes and was not passed by the California State Senate before the end of the session, preventing it from appearing on the November 2022 ballot.

See also
 13th (film)
 Penal labor in the United States
 Convict lease
 Felony disenfranchisement in the United States

References

United States slavery law
States of the United States law-related lists
Criminal justice reform
Prison reform